Heretics is the sixth studio album by the alternative rock band Toadies. It was released in September 2015 by independent record label Kirtland Records.  The studio album "re-imagines and reinterprets" several of the band's previously released songs, including the band's most popular single, "Possum Kingdom".  The album also features two new songs and a cover of Blondie's 1979 hit single "Heart of Glass".

Track listing

Personnel
Vaden Todd Lewis - Rhythm Guitar/Vocals
Clark Vogeler - Lead Guitar/Backing Vocals
Doni Blair - Bass
Mark Reznicek - Drums

References

Toadies albums
Kirtland Records albums